Knefastia cubaguaensis is an extinct species of sea snail, a marine gastropod mollusc in the family Pseudomelatomidae, the turrids and allies.

Description

Distribution
This extinct marine species was found in lower Pliocene strata in Venezuela.

References

External links
 Landau, Bernard M., et al. "Systematics of the gastropods of the Lower–Middle Miocene Cantaure Formation, Paraguaná Peninsula, Venezuela." Bulletins of American Paleontology 389.390 (2016): 1-582

cubaguaensis
Gastropods described in 2016